Garadjari (Karajarri, many other spellings; see below) is an Australian Aboriginal language spoken by the Karajarri people. The language is a member of the Marrngu subgroup of the Pama-Nyungan family. It is spoken along the coast of northwestern Australia.

Name
The name has many spelling variants, including:
Garadjari (used by A Grammar of Garadjari)
Garadjiri
Garadyari
Garadyaria
Gard'are
Karadjeri (used by Ethnologue)
Karajarri (used by the Handbook of Western Australian Aboriginal languages and is the spelling selected by the Karajarri people for their native title claims)
Karatjarri (used by Australian Languages)
Karatyarri
Karrajarra
Karrajarri

Kurajarra / Guradjara is sometimes confused with Garadjari, but it appears to have been a separate language.

Phoneme inventory 
Garadjari's phoneme inventory is typical of Australian languages, and is identical to the inventories of the other Marrngu languages. There are 17 consonant phonemes.

Also typical of Australian languages, there are only three vowel phonemes.

References

Notes

Marrngu languages